Chonetes is an extinct genus of brachiopods. It ranged from the Late Ordovician to the Middle Jurassic.

Species 
The following species of Chonetes have been described:

 C. (Paeckelmannia)
 C. baragwanathi
 C. billingsi (Floresta Formation, Colombia)
 C. burlingtonensis
 C. chamishkjensis
 C. chaoi
 C. cherokeensis
 C. chesterensis
 C. compressa
 C. comstockii (Floresta Fm.)
 C. concentrica
 C. concentricus
 C. deliciasensis
 C. flemingi
 C. foedus
 C. foshagi
 C. geniculata
 C. glabra
 C. glenparkensis
 C. gregarius
 C. illinoisensis
 C. logani
 C. mesoloba
 C. missouriensis
 C. moelleri
 C. monosensis
 C. multicosta
 C. obtusa
 C. oklahomensis
 C. ornata
 C. pinegensis
 C. planumbona
 C. posturalicus
 C. pygmoideus
 C. rarispina
 C. semiovalis
 C. shumardiana
 C. sichuanensis
 C. sinuatus
 C. squama
 C. stubeli (Floresta Fm.)
 C. suavis
 C. timanica
 C. variolaris

 Names brought to synonymy
 Chonetes elegans L.B. Smyth 1922, a synonym for Chonetes speciosus - abundant in the shales associated  with the main limestone near Ballycastle, Northern Ireland.
 Chonetes elegans L. G. de Koninck, 1847, a synonym for Plicochonetes elegans (L.G. de Koninck, 1847)

References

Further reading 
 Fossils (Smithsonian Handbooks) by David Ward (Page 83)

Strophomenida
Prehistoric brachiopod genera
Paleozoic brachiopods
Paleozoic animals of North America
Paleozoic brachiopods of South America
Devonian Colombia
Fossils of Colombia
Late Ordovician first appearances
Middle Jurassic extinctions
Fossil taxa described in 1830
Jeffersonville Limestone
Paleozoic life of Ontario
Paleozoic life of Alberta
Paleozoic life of British Columbia
Floresta Formation
Paleozoic life of Manitoba
Paleozoic life of the Northwest Territories
Paleozoic life of Nova Scotia
Paleozoic life of Nunavut
Paleozoic life of Quebec
Paleozoic life of Yukon